172nd Infantry Brigade may refer to:
172. Infanterie-Brigade, 86th Infantry Division (German Empire)
172nd (2/1st South Lancashire) Brigade
172nd Infantry Brigade (United States)